Declaration of Conformity is the first studio album by the American rock band Wellwater Conspiracy. It was released on June 17, 1997, through Third Gear Records.

Overview
The album was recorded in 1996 and 1997. This is the only Wellwater Conspiracy album in which Ben Shepherd sings all of the songs. The album was released to general critical acclaim. Matt Diehl of Rolling Stone said, "Declaration of Conformity suggests that these Soundgarden expats have left the Seattle sound behind for trippy psychedelia that recalls such 1960s freak icons as Syd Barrett and 13th Floor Elevators. Declaration's tinny, fuzzed-out sonics decidedly evoke the Summer of Love."

Track listing

Japanese bonus tracks

Personnel
Wellwater Conspiracy
Matt Cameron – drums, vocals, mini-moog, simulated rain, acoustic guitar, guitar solo on "Lucy Leave"
John McBain – guitars, bass guitar, drums on "Far Side of Your Moon" and "Palomar Observatory"
Ben Shepherd – vocals

Additional musicians
Lou Alexander – bass assistance on "Shel Talmy"

References

External links
Declaration of Conformity information at nowinvisibly.com

1997 debut albums
Wellwater Conspiracy albums
Albums produced by Matt Cameron